The Cerro Barcino Formation (also known as the Gorro Frigio Formation) is a geological formation in South America whose strata span the Early Cretaceous to the earliest Late Cretaceous. The top age for the formation has been estimated to be Cenomanian. Earlier estimates placed the formation until the Campanian.

The formation was deposited in the Cañadón Asfalto Basin, a rift basin that started forming in the earliest Jurassic. Dinosaur remains are among the fossils that have been recovered from the formation.

The Cerro Barcino Formation is the second-youngest unit of the Chubut Group, which also includes the older Los Adobes Formation. Both formations cover a vast area in Chubut Province, Argentina. The two formations are distinguished by geological features suggesting a distinct change in climate, from a wetter, flood plain environment in the Los Adobes to a much more arid, desert-like environment in the Cerro Barcino.

The Cerro Barcino Formation is subdivided into several subunits (members). From oldest to youngest:
 Bayo Overo (Correlates with both the Puesto La Paloma and the Cerro Castaño members)
Puesto La Paloma
 Characterized by arid plains interspersed with sand dunes
 Cerro Castaño
 A return to more humid, flood-plain conditions
 Las Plumas
The Puesto La Paloma Member dates from ~118-113 Ma, the Cerro Castaño Member dates from ~113-100.5 Ma, correlating with the Albian, and the Las Plumas Member dates from ~100.5-98 Ma.

Fossil content 
Indeterminate abelisaurid remains from the Puesto La Paloma Member. Possible indeterminate carcharodontosaurid remains. Indeterminate Titanosauria remains. Also, an unnamed titanosauriform.

Lepidosaurs (Kaikaifilusaurus minimus) and Testudinata (Chubutemys copelloi and Prochelidella cerrobarcinae) are also discovered from this formation.

Crurotarsans

Dinosaurs

See also 
 List of dinosaur-bearing rock formations
 La Amarga Formation, contemporaneous fossiliferous formation of the Neuquén Basin
 Lohan Cura Formation, contemporaneous fossiliferous formation of the Neuquén Basin
 Río Belgrano Formation, contemporaneous fossiliferous formation of the Austral Basin

References

Bibliography 
 
 
 
 
 
 
  

 
Geologic formations of Argentina
Cretaceous Argentina
Sandstone formations
Mudstone formations
Conglomerate formations
Tuff formations
Alluvial deposits
Fluvial deposits
Fossiliferous stratigraphic units of South America
Paleontology in Argentina
Geology of Chubut Province